HouseBroken is an American animated sitcom created by Jennifer Crittenden, Clea DuVall, and Gabrielle Allan that premiered on Fox on May 31, 2021. In August 2021, the series was renewed for a second season which premiered on December 4, 2022.

Plot
HouseBroken follows an anthropomorphic therapy dog named Honey, who explores human dysfunctions and neurosis by applying her knowledge of psychiatry through leading a group of other anthropomorphic neighborhood animals in group therapy sessions.

Cast

Main

 Lisa Kudrow as Honey, a standard poodle who opens her living room for the group to come and support each other. Honey also struggles with her own problems, such as mourning the death of her best friend Big Cookie and her arranged (by her human) marriage with Chief.
 Clea DuVall as Elsa, a power-hungry, know-it-all Corgi and service dog in training — or so she claims — who drives Honey crazy. Her owner is a neglectful and oblivious young woman who only put a service vest on Elsa so that she can get away with or do things that are considered illegal without repercussions.
 Nat Faxon as
 Chief, a sloppy and not-too-bright St. Bernard and Honey's mate who enjoys eating socks, playing in mud, and licking himself.
 Nathan, a male blue-and-yellow macaw who is very pretentious and selfish, and enjoys tormenting others.
 Will Forte as Shel, a tortoise with intimacy issues and a shoe fetish. He was initially in a relationship with a single croc he names "Lindsay" and was going to marry it until his mate Darla returns after 15 years. In the episode "Who Are You?", it is revealed that Shel lives with other animals but never talks about them to the group due to his narcissism. His youngest owner goes to the same elementary school Nibbles lives at. He then gets into a polyamorous relationship with Darla and Lindsay. In the episode "Who's a Bad Girl? (Part 1)", it is revealed Lindsay belongs to Xavier, Shel's original owner who forgot the shoe when he went to college. Both Shel and Darla become parents in season 2.
 Tony Hale as
Diablo, an anxious, sweater-wearing mixed-breed Terrier with OCD. He became Big Cookie's replacement in the session group. His owners are divorced and share joint custody of him. However, in "Who Are You?", his owners decide to let him pick his forever home, and he ultimately decides to live with his "father." His "mother" is revealed to be Jewish in season 2 as he both wears Christmas and Hanukkah-themed clothing.
Max, George Clooney's Berkshire Pig, a former actor and current status obsessed narcissist. He is named after George Clooney's real life pig who died in 2006. This is brought up in the episode "Who Are You?" when Max realizes there was another pig named Max before him and is essentially his replacement. In the episode "Who's a Bad Girl? (Part 1)", he is sent to live with Ray Liotta. In season 2, he starts living with David Spade.
 Sharon Horgan as Tabitha, an aging Persian cat and a retired beauty queen, trying to adjust to life off the cat show circuit. She speaks with a Russian accent. She initially lives with her owners Stelios and Brett and a kitten named Kit-Kat. In the fourth episode, consumed by jealousy at her owners giving more attention to Kit-Kat than they do to her, she runs away from home and starts living at a cat cafe. Tabitha eventually hates it after someone at the cafe tried to catnap her and starts living with The Gray One and other cats in the seventh episode. Tabitha and The Gray One become a couple in the ninth episode. She eventually reunites with her owners in the tenth episode.
 Jason Mantzoukas as The Gray One, a street-smart russian blue who lives with about forty or sixty other cats and has a crush on Tabitha who wouldn't give him the time of day. He is missing an eye and riddled with diseases. His owner is an old cat lady and hoarder who never leaves her house. The Gray One and Tabitha become a couple in the ninth episode.
 Sam Richardson as Chico, a chunky, co-dependent and very naive tabby cat. He considers his owner Kevin to be his best friend though his feelings for him are more than platonic. In the episode "Who's a Good Therapist?", it is revealed that he is pregnant and gave birth to eight kittens during a therapy session which Elsa was in charge of. His kittens were given away for adoption in the episode "Who's Getting Cold Feet?" It also turns out his pregnancy was the result of him mating with a male cat. In the season 1 finale "Who's a Bad Girl? (Part 2)", it is revealed his owner is a flight attendant and Chico actually belonged to Kevin's ex-girlfriend Dana before she abandoned him.
 Tchotchke, a slow loris who does not speak, but communicates via body language and a cocktail umbrella, which he appears to have an attachment to. He lives in Jill's shed.

Recurring

 Maria Bamford as 
Jill, Honey and Chief's human owner. She works as a therapist.
Darla, Shel's mate who returned after she was missing for 15 years.
 Greta Lee as Bubbles, a horny, teenage goldfish who lives with Honey and Chief. She heckles the other animals. It is revealed in the episode "Who Are You?" that she is not the first Bubbles.
 Bresha Webb as Nibbles, a psychopathic hamster who is mourning the loss of her mate (whom she killed). She is a classroom pet for a third grade classroom.
 Brian Tyree Henry as Armando, a wild coyote who Honey has a crush on.
 Timothy Simons as Raccoon, a wild raccoon that loves the outdoors, and willing to show everyone that they have their wild sides inside.

Guest
 Dax Shepard and Kristen Bell as Rutabaga and Juliet, respectively, an ideal dog couple that Honey is jealous of.
 Anna Faris as Lil' Bunny, an Afghan Hound, and the dog of a social media influencer who Honey befriends in an epic game of frisbee on the beach.
 Faris has also voiced Chartreuse in "Who's a Good Therapist?".
 Sarah Cooper as Lenny
 Nicole Byer as Larrabee
 Ben Schwartz as Brice, an Unnamed cat, and Bunny Paul.
 Cathy Moriarty (Season 1) and Kathleen Turner (Season 2) as Nancy, Nathan's owner and Jill's mother.
 Nicole Sullivan as Little Cookie, the new puppy of Jill's neighbors.
 Others
 Paul F. Tompkins as Ray Liotta
 David Spade as Himself
 Phil LaMarr and Maddie Corman as Guernico and Caravaggio

Episodes

Series overview

Season 1 (2021)

Season 2 (2022)

Production

Development
The show's early working title was Therapy Dog. On December 19, 2019, Fox ordered the show to series. HouseBroken is created by Clea DuVall, Jennifer Crittenden, and Gabrielle Allan who were expected to executive produce alongside Sharon Horgan, Clelia Mountford, Aaron Kaplan, and Dana Honor. On August 9, 2021, Fox renewed the series for a second season.

Casting
Alongside the initial series announcement, Lisa Kudrow, Clea DuVall, Nat Faxon, Will Forte, Tony Hale, Sharon Horgan, Jason Mantzoukas, and Sam Richardson were cast as series regulars.

Broadcast
HouseBroken premiered on May 31, 2021, on Fox. In Canada, it airs on CTV 2 and streams on Amazon Prime Video. In Australia, it streams on Paramount+. The second season premiered on December 4, 2022, with two Christmas themed episodes.

Reception

Critical response
On review aggregator Rotten Tomatoes, the series holds an approval rating of 50% based on 10 critic reviews, with an average rating of 4.5/10. The website's critics consensus reads, "Housebroken boasts an insanely talented voice cast—if only its basic writing would learn some new narrative tricks." On Metacritic, it has a weighted average score of 66 out of 100, based on 7 critics, indicating "generally favorable reviews".

Ratings

Season 1

Season 2

References

External links
 
 

2020s American animated comedy television series
2020s American adult animated television series
2020s American sitcoms
2021 American television series debuts
Animated television series about dogs
Animated television series about cats
Animated television series about pigs
Animated television series about animals
Animated television series about turtles
American animated sitcoms
American adult animated comedy television series
English-language television shows
Fox Broadcasting Company original programming
Television shows set in California
Television shows set in Los Angeles
Television series by Fox Entertainment
Television series by Kapital Entertainment